Our Language may refer to:

Meänkieli
Acquaviva Collecroce
Limba noastră